Westfield Technical Academy  (formerly known as Westfield Vocational Technical High School), is a technical, coeducational, four-year public high school, part of the Westfield Public Schools district in Westfield, Massachusetts, United States. The school opened on October 1, 1911, as the Westfield Independent Industrial School.

School name history 

Westfield Independent Industrial School; Westfield Day Industrial School for Boys; Westfield Evening Trade/Industrial School (1911-1917)
Westfield Boys Trade School (1917-1950)
Westfield Trade High School (1950-1969)
Westfield Vocational High School (1969-1994)
Westfield Vocational Technical High School (1994-2015)
Westfield Technical Academy (2015–present)

List of principals 
1911: William C. Shute
1911-1919: Burton A. Prince
1919-1950: Chester C. Derby
1950-1952: Leonard H. Scott
1952-1957: Vincent P. Kramer
1957-1976: Michael Gonzalez
1976-1984: Arthur A. Peters
1984-1989: Alfred R. Rios
1989-2006: Steven E. Pippin
2006-2012: Hilary Weisgerber
2012-2016: Stefan Czaporowski
2016–Present: Joseph F. Langone

Past school locations 
Broad Street, Westfield, Massachusetts 01085 (1911-1917)
25 Bartlett Street, Westfield, Massachusetts 01085 (1917-1962)
33 Smith Avenue, Westfield, Massachusetts 01085 (1962–present)

Technical programs
Westfield Technical Academy currently offers career-technical training in twelve programs:
Allied Health
Arts and Communication (1994-Present)
Automotive Technology
Aviation Technology (2015–Present)
Business Technology (1994–Present)
Collision Technology (1994–Present)
Construction Technology
Culinary Arts
Electrical Wiring
Horticulture Technology (1994–Present)
Information Technology
Manufacturing Technology (1911–Present)

Former technical programs
HVAC/R Technology (1994-2008), discontinued due to low enrollment. The room which was for HVAC/R Technology (on the upper campus) is now part of Electrical Wiring.

Sports
Soccer (Boys Varsity/Junior Varsity, Girls Varsity)
Baseball (Boys Varsity/Junior Varsity)
Basketball (Boys Varsity/Junior Varsity, Girls Varsity)
Golf (Boys/Girls Varsity)
Softball (Girls Varsity)
Cross Country (Boys/Girls Varsity)

Notable co-operative sports
Wrestling (Boys Varsity with Westfield High School)
Lacrosse (Boys/Girls Varsity with St. Mary's Parish School)
Skiing (Boys/Girls Varsity with Gateway Regional High School)
Swimming (Boys/Girls Varsity with Westfield High School)

Former sports
Football (Boys Varsity) (Late 1990s-2006)

References

External links
 Westfield Technical Academy Website
 City of Westfield

Gallery

Educational institutions established in 1911
Public high schools in Massachusetts
Schools in Hampden County, Massachusetts
Westfield, Massachusetts
1911 establishments in Massachusetts